Charles Peter Magnusson (born 9 December 1974) is a Swedish actor, writer and comedian.

Career
Magnusson was the presenter of the first season of Idol 2004 in Sweden along with David Hellenius. Along with David Hellenius and Christine Meltzer he was also a member of a group of comedians who hosted the comedy sketch-show Hey Baberiba on TV4, in which they parodied Swedish celebrities.

He was the presenter of the comedy show Situation Magnusson, which was premiered on TV4 on 8 February 2007. Magnusson traveled around Europe in disguise, displaying bad and loud behaviour in front of unsuspecting people who were being filmed by a hidden camera. His most noted character was Mike Hunt, a reporter from Sky News in London.

Magnusson was also one of the regular hosts of Fredag Hela Veckan, a Swedish version of Saturday Night Live. In 2009 Magnusson appeared as the three main characters of the TV4 miniseries "Blomstertid": Kenneth, Steven and Anders.

Magnusson wrote and acted in the film A Midsummer Night’s Party in 2009 and Once Upon a Time in Phuket in 2012.

Films
A Midsummer Night's Party (2009)
Once Upon a Time in Phuket (2012)
Lasse-Majas detektivbyrå – von Broms hemlighet (2013)
Tillbaka till Bromma (2014)
10 000 timmar (2014)
Micke & Veronica (2014)
I nöd eller lust (2015)
Sommaren med släkten, (2017 г.)

TV shows
Pyjamas, ZTV, 2001–2002
Slussen, TV3, 2002
Pass På (Be alert), ZTV, 2003
Godafton Sverige (Good afternoon Sweden), TV3, 2003–2004
Idol 2004, TV4, 2004
Stadskampen (Cityfighters), TV4, 2005
Lilla kycklingen (Chicken little), 2005, Swedish vocal
Hey Baberiba, TV4, 2005–2006
Situation Magnusson, TV4, 2007
Fredag hela veckan (Friday all week), TV4, 2007-
Hjälp! (Help!), 2008
Blomstertid, 2009
Stockholm-Båstad, 2011

References

External links

Situation Magnusson, TV4.se
Hey Baberiba

1974 births
Living people
Swedish television personalities
Swedish comedians
Male actors from Stockholm